Yuddham is a 1984 Telugu-language action drama film directed by Dasari Narayana Rao. The film stars Krishna, Krishnam Raju, Jayasudha and Jaya Prada . The music was composed by Chakravarthy.

Cast
 Krishna as Kishan & Krishna Rao (Dual role)
 Krishnam Raju as Raja &  Arjuna Rao (Dual role)
 Jayasudha
 Jaya Prada
 Raadhika as Raja's mother
 Sujatha as Kishan's mother
 Kaikala Satyanarayana
 Rao Gopal Rao
 Allu Rama Lingaiah
 Gollapudi Maruti Rao

Soundtrack

External links

1984 films
1980s Telugu-language films
1980s action drama films
Indian action drama films
Films directed by Dasari Narayana Rao
Films scored by K. Chakravarthy
1984 drama films